Suttle is an unincorporated community in Starr Hill Township, in western Washington County, Arkansas, United States. It is located on Washington County Road 33 and on the east bank of Moores Creek. Lincoln lies about two miles to the southwest.

References

Unincorporated communities in Washington County, Arkansas
Unincorporated communities in Arkansas